EFG International is a global private banking group offering private banking and asset management services, headquartered in Zurich. EFG International's group of private banking businesses operates in around 40 locations worldwide, with more than 3,073 employees (as of 31 December 2020).

History 
EFG (European Financial Group) International was formed in 1995 by Jean Pierre Cuoni Lawrence D. Howell, Baron Corso von Habsburg and five others. The genesis of the bank was by the acquisitions of both the right to operate from the Zurich office of Banque de Deposits and the Swiss operations of the Royal Bank of Scotland.

Structure 
EFG International's largest shareholder is EFG Bank European Financial Group, a Swiss bank based in Geneva, holding about 44.8% of its capital. This is in turn a distinct and separate sub-group of European Financial Group EFG (Luxembourg) (“EFG Group”), based in Luxembourg. In addition, BTG Pactual holds 28.9% of EFG International.

EFG Bank is EFG International’s main Swiss private banking subsidiary. EFG Bank is headquartered in Zurich, and has branches and representative offices across Europe, Asia Pacific, the Americas and Middle East. EFG International has a number of other private banking subsidiaries including EFG Private Bank Limited in the UK and EFG Capital in the US.

The family's largest holding is its EFG Bank European Financial Group in Luxembourg, a private banking group that operates in many jurisdictions. The Group holds 44.8% of EFG International, a global private banking group offering private banking and asset management services, listed in Switzerland on the Zurich Stock Exchange. EFGI's group of private banking businesses operates in around 40 locations worldwide, with more than 3,000 employees.

Executive committee 
 Giorgio Pradelli - Chief Executive Officer 
 Vassiliki Dimitrakopoulou - Global Head of Legal & Compliance 
 Martin Freiermuth - Chief Operating Officer 
 Dimitris Politis - Chief Financial Officer
 Enrico Piotto - Chief Risk Officer

References 

Banks based in Zürich
Companies listed on the SIX Swiss Exchange